is a Japanese video game developer formed in 2004 when former Capcom employees Noritaka Funamizu (ex-general manager of Capcom's Production Studio 1) and Katsuhiro Sudo (producer) left the company. At its start, it had eight employees.

List of Crafts & Meister's games

References

External links
 
Developers blog 

Video game companies established in 2004
Japanese companies established in 2004
Video game companies of Japan
Video game development companies